Clan MacDuff or Clan Duff is a Lowland Scottish clan. The clan does not currently have a chief and is therefore considered an Armigerous clan, which is registered with the Lyon Court. The early chiefs of Clan MacDuff were the original Earls of Fife, although this title went to the Stewarts of Albany in the late fourteenth century. The title returned to the MacDuff chief when William Duff was made Earl Fife in 1759. His descendant Alexander Duff was made Duke of Fife in 1889.

History

Origins of the clan

The Clan Duff claims descent from the original Royal Scoto-Pictish line of which Queen Gruoch of Scotland, wife of Macbeth, King of Scotland, was the senior representative. After the death of MacBeth, Malcolm III of Scotland seized the Crown and his son, Aedh, married the daughter of Queen Gruoch. Aedh was created Earl of Fife and abbot of Abernethy. The early chiefs of Clan MacDuff were the Earls of Fife. Sir Iain Moncreiffe wrote that the Clan MacDuff was the premier clan among the Scottish Gaels. Today, the Earls of Wemyss are thought to be the descendants in the male line of Gille Míchéil, Earl of Fife, thought to be one of the first Clan MacDuff chiefs. Gille-michael MacDuff was one of the witnesses to the great charter of David I of Scotland to Dunfermline Abbey.

14th and 15th centuries

In 1306 during the Wars of Scottish Independence, Duncan MacDuff, Earl of Fife, was as a minor, held by Edward I of England at the coronation of Robert the Bruce as his ward while Duncan's sister, Isabella MacDuff, placed the golden circlet upon King Robert's head. As a result, when she fell into the hands of King Edward's army, she was imprisoned in a cage which was suspended from the walls of Berwick Castle. Duncan MacDuff later married Mary, the niece of King Edward, and threw in his lot against the Bruce. However, he was captured and imprisoned in Kildrummy Castle where he died in 1336. The Earldom later fell into the hands of Robert Stewart, Duke of Albany, however, although the MacDuff family lost their rank, they continued to prosper. In 1384, the earl of Fife was described as capitalis legis de Clenmcduffe, meaning chief of the law of Clan MacDuff. In 1404, David Duff received a charter from Robert III of Scotland for lands in Banffshire.

17th, 18th and 19th centuries

In 1626, John Duff sold the lands in Banffshire which his ancestor had acquired in 1404. The title of The Fife returned with William Duff, 1st Earl Fife and Viscount Macduff, in 1759. The 1st Earl Fife's cousin, Captain Robert Duff of the Royal Navy supported the British-Hanoverian Government during the Jacobite rising of 1745 and was involved in the Skirmish of Arisaig. James Duff, 4th Earl Fife fought with distinction in the Peninsular War where he was wounded at the Battle of Talavera in 1809 and was later made a Knight of the Order of St Ferdinand of Spain.

Alexander Duff, 6th Earl Fife, married Louise, Princess Royal, eldest daughter of Edward VII. Alexander was advanced to the rank of Duke of Fife in July 1889.

20th and 21st centuries
With the death of the 1st Duke of Fife, the Clan MacDuff had its last Chief.

Law of Clan MacDuff
Clan Macduff was the first Scottish clan to be recognized as a clan by the Scottish Parliament, by legislation dated November 1384.

The Earl of Fife and the Abbot of Abernethy were both "Capitals of Law of the Clan MacDuff". The law protected all murderers within ninth degree of kin to the Earl of Fife, as they could claim sanctuary at the Cross of MacDuff near Abernethy, and could find remission by paying compensation to the victim's family.

The chiefs of the clan had the right to enthrone the King on the Stone of Scone. When the Stone of Scone was taken to England by Edward I of England, Robert I of Scotland had himself crowned King of Scots a second time, in order to be crowned by a member of clan MacDuff, in that case the Earl of Fife's sister.

In 1425, the last Earl of Fife, Murdoch Stewart, Duke of Albany, was beheaded. The Clan MacDuff's hereditary right of bearing the Crown of Scotland then passed to the Lord Abernethy. The current Lord Abernethy, who is consequently bearer of the Scottish Crown, is Alexander Douglas-Hamilton, 16th Duke of Hamilton.

Clan Castles

Macduff's Castle in East Wemyss, Fife, is now a ruinous castle that was once held by the MacDuff Earls of Fife. The property later went to the Clan Wemyss who built the present castle.
Airdit House in Leuchers, Fife, was originally held by the MacDuffs but later went to the Clan Stewart who held it in 1425 when Murdoch Stewart, Duke of Albany (also then Earl and Duke of Fife), was executed.
Barnslee Castle near Markinch, Fife, was held by the Clan MacDuff. One story is that a tunnel led from it to Maiden Castle (see below), that was about three miles away.
Castle Hill in North Berwick in East Lothian was probably held by the MacDuff Earls of Fife who had a ferry from North Berwick to Earlsferry in Fife.
Cupar Castle in Cupar, Fife, was held by the Clan MacDuff.
Falkland Palace in Falkland, Fife. There was a castle here that was held by the MacDuff Earls of Fife although it was destroyed by the English in 1337. It was re-built in 1371 and passed to Robert Stewart, Duke of Albany, who was then also Earl of Fife.
Fernie Castle in Cupar, Fife, was once held by the MacDuff Earls of Fife.
Maiden Castle near Methil, Fife, was once held by the Clan MacDuff. One story is that a tunnel led from it to Barnslee Castle (see above), that was about three miles away.

Notes

See also
 Earl Fife
 Earl of Fife
 Duke of Fife
 Barony of MacDuff

References

Moncreiffe of that Ilk, Sir Ian. The Highland Clans. New York City: Clarkson N. Potter, Inc., 1982. .

External links
Clan MacDuff Society of America
The Scottish Studies Foundation

 
MacDuff